USNS 2nd Lt. John P. Bobo, formally MV 2nd Lt. John P. Bobo (AK-3008) is a strategic sealift ship currently in service with the United States Navy since its original charter in 1985. The ship is named after US Marine Medal of Honor recipient 2nd Lieutenant John P. Bobo. She is the only US Navy ship to bear the name.

Design 
Built by the General Dynamics Quincy Shipbuilding Division of Quincy, Massachusetts, the USNS 2nd Lt. John P. Bobo is the lead of her class of roll-on/roll-off ships. These ships are built to support a 17,000 man US Marine Air Ground Task Force for 30 days.

Like the rest of her class, the ship is 673 feet [205.13 m] long, 105 feet [32 m] wide and has a draft of 29 feet [8.8 m], displacing 40,846 tons fully loaded.

The ship is built to carry roll on/roll off vehicles, ammunition, general and liquid cargo. The vessel has 162,500 square feet of vehicle storage space, can carry up to 1,605,000 gallons of petroleum, 81,700 gallons of water, and 522 twenty-foot equivalent unit containers. In addition to cargo space, 2 LCM-8, 1 Side Loadable Warping Tug, 4 Causeway Section, Powered, and 4 Causeway Section, Non Powered equipment can also be carried.

Vehicle storage is towards the aft, which is facilitated by a 1.538 tons per square inch retractable ramp.

Two Stork-Wartsila Werkspoor 18TM410 diesel engines provide 26,400 brake horse power  (bhp) which allows the ship to make 17.7 knots though one shaft. It has a range of 12,840 nautical miles at 18 knots. In addition to the main engines, a 1,000 bhp (746 Watt) bow thruster aids in maneuvering. The low physical overhead of the engines allow for another deck of vehicle space above.

A total of 5 39 ton cranes are used to move cargo, situated with two double cranes at midship and a single forward. One helicopter platform is located aft, rated to land up to a CH-53E helicopter.

Service history 
USNS 2nd Lt. John P. Bobo was chartered by the US Military Sealift Command on 14 February 1985 after completion. As it was not a commissioned ship, it was designated with the civilian prefix of M/V, motor vessel, not the military prefix of USNS, or United States Naval Ship. Unlike her four other sister ships at Guam, she is stationed in Europe for her career. 

On 16 January 2007 the US Navy officially purchased the ship, designating her USNS.

In Europe, she was assigned to the Maritime Prepositioning Force (MPF) with Maritime Prepositioning Ship Squadron One where she served as its last flagship until its dissolution on 28 September 2012. The propose of the MPF is to strategically place supply ships in key parts of the world where the supplies onboard would be readily available in the event of a crisis.

Gallery

References 

Ships built in Quincy, Massachusetts
Bulk carriers of the United States Navy
1985 ships